Gebrinius is a local Celtic version of the god Mercury. In the 2nd century AD an altar was set up at Bonn to honour him. The stone depicts the god in full Roman aspect, but is, nevertheless, dedicated to "Mercury Gebrinius", perhaps of the name of a local divinity of the Ubii, whose cult was linked to that of the Roman god.

References 

 Dictionary of Celtic Myth and Legend. Miranda Green. Thames and Hudson Ltd. London. 1997

Gaulish gods
Mercurian deities